Reza Salehi Amiri is an Iranian politician, who was the President of National Olympic Committee of the Islamic Republic of Iran, from 2018 to 2022. He was a deputy to Mayor of Tehran and was also Minister of Culture and Islamic Guidance and President of National Library of Iran. He was previously served as acting Minister of Youth Affairs and Sports from August to October 2013. On 23 October 2016, Salehi Amiri was nominated by President Hassan Rouhani as Minister of Culture and Islamic Guidance, needing parliament's approval. He was approved by the parliament with 192 votes.

He is graduate of political science and Public administration from Azad University and Tehran University is also a professor at the university. He has written 14 books and 60 scientific articles.

References

Academic staff of the University of Tehran
1962 births
Living people
Moderation and Development Party politicians
Deputies of the Ministry of Intelligence (Iran)
Heads of the National Library of Iran